All official holidays in Lithuania are established by acts of Seimas.

Public holidays
The following are official holidays in Lithuania, that mean days off:

Commemorative Days
The list of other observances (atmintinos dienos) is set by law and includes a total of 71 days, not including the public holidays above.

See also

References

 
Lithuania
Festivals in Lithuania
Lithuanian culture-related lists
Holidays